Unione Sportiva Sassuolo Calcio, commonly referred to as Sassuolo, is an Italian football club based in Sassuolo, Emilia-Romagna. Their colours are black and green, hence the nickname Neroverdi (literally "black and green", in Italian).

Sassuolo have played in Serie A since the 2013–14 season, joining a select group of teams playing in the Serie A but not belonging to a provincial capital city: U.S. Savoia 1908 (Torre Annunziata), Empoli, Legnano, Pro Patria (Busto Arsizio), Carpi and Casale.

History 
The club was founded in 1920 and played in the Emilian amateur divisions for most of its history until its first promotion to Serie D in 1968. In this era, the club merged with other local football teams to eventually form the current US Sassuolo Calcio in 1974. In 1984, the club gained promotion to Serie C2, the lowest level of professional football in Italy. However, they were relegated in 1990 and subsequently spent most of the 1990s in Serie D. In 1998, a second-place finish ensured promotion back to Serie C2.

Serie C1 
Sassuolo reached Serie C1 for the first time in 2006 after winning the Serie C2 promotion play-offs by beating Sansovino in the final. In the following years, Sassuolo proved to be a serious contender for promotion to Serie B. With Gian Marco Remondina as head coach, they barely missed it in 2007, as they lost immediate promotion to Grosseto in the final days of the season, finishing in second-place; and then were defeated by fifth-placed Monza in the play-off semi-finals. Remondina then left Sassuolo to join Serie B's Piacenza, and former Serie A player Massimiliano Allegri was then chosen as new head coach.

Under Allegri, Sassuolo quickly revived their hopes to obtain promotion to Serie B; this ultimately came on 27 April 2008, when they won the Serie C1/A title, thus ensuring a historical promotion to Serie B, the first in the club's history.

Serie B 
Following Sassuolo's promotion to the Italian second tier, Allegri left Sassuolo to fill the head coaching position at Serie A team Cagliari. In July 2008, the club appointed former Atalanta and Siena boss Andrea Mandorlini for the 2008–09 season.

Sassuolo had a surprisingly good start to the 2008–09 campaign and held a promotion playoff place for a very long time. They only won two points in their last five matches to eventually finish in seventh place. Despite a successful season, Mandorlini left Sassuolo by mutual consent in June 2009, whereupon the team then appointed former Piacenza coach Stefano Pioli on 11 June 2009.

Sassuolo successively qualified to the Serie B promotion playoffs in 2009–10 by placing fourth, and 2011–12 in third, being eliminated at the semi-finals in both seasons.

In the 2012–13 season, however, under the guidance of new head coach Eusebio Di Francesco, Sassuolo played a majority of the season in first place in the table, and eventually secured direct promotion with a 1-0 victory over Livorno on 18 May 2013. At the conclusion of the season, Sassuolo had won the Serie B title and had ensured a first top-flight campaign ever for the 2013–14 season. The club had reached the highest level of the Italian football league system only seven years after playing in Serie C2. The key role that was played in this achievement by 18-year-old academy product Domenico Berardi saw the player win the league's Player of the Year award.

Serie A 
During pre-season training in July 2013, Sassuolo won the TIM Trophy after beating Juventus on penalties then beating Milan 2–1, marking the first time a team other than Milan, Internazionale or Juventus have won the Cup.

On 25 August 2013, Sassuolo played their first-ever Serie A match, a 2–0 loss away at Torino. The team's second match was their first at home, against Livorno, where striker Simone Zaza scored Sassuolo's first top-flight goal as they lost 4–1. On 22 September 2013, Sassuolo endured a heavy 7–0 defeat at home to Internazionale. The team earned their first point in their fifth match, on 25 September away to Napoli. Zaza equalised as the game finished 1–1, ending the hosts' perfect start to the season. This was followed by a first home point on 29 September, a 2–2 draw with Lazio. On 20 October 2013, Sassuolo won their first Serie A game, defeating Bologna 2–1 at home with goals from Domenico Berardi and Antonio Floro Flores, moving the club off bottom place. Sassuolo won away for the first time in Serie A on 3 November against Sampdoria, with Berardi scoring their first top-flight hat-trick to win 4–3. Since the following match, a 1–1 draw at Roma on 10 November, the club has been outside the relegation zone. On 12 January 2014, Berardi was the only player in the season to score four goals in a game, as Sassuolo came from 2–0 down to win 4–3 against Milan. Towards the end of January 2014, Sassuolo were in bottom place and so manager Di Francesco was relieved of his duties and Alberto Malesani was brought in. The managerial change did not have the desired effects and so in early March, Sassuolo re-entrusted the side to the management of Di Francesco. Sassuolo won its away match against Fiorentina 4–3 on 6 May 2014, and after winning 4–2 against Genoa on 11 May, Sassuolo guaranteed its place in Serie A for the 2014–15 season. Berardi finished in equal 7th place in the Serie A top scorers list, with 16 goals for the season.

The Neroverdi had a much better 2014–15 Serie A season, finishing comfortably beyond relegation in 12th place. Berardi was once more the club's top goalscorer with 15 league goals.

Sassuolo improved again in the 2015–16 Serie A season, finishing ahead of the likes of Milan and Lazio in sixth place. The season included an opening day win over Napoli, a Round 10 1–0 victory over Juventus at Mapei Stadium and a 1–0 victory over Inter at the San Siro.

On 21 May 2016, Sassuolo achieved their first ever Europa League qualification after finishing sixth in 2015–16 courtesy of a Juventus Coppa Italia win over Milan as Milan would have gone to Europe instead if they had won the final. On 25 August 2016, Sassuolo qualified for the Europa League group stage after beating Red Star Belgrade 4–1 on aggregate in the playoff round.

Over the following three seasons, the Neroverdi returned to mid-table, ending the 2016–17 season in 12th position, and then the club followed this up with consecutive 11th place finishes in 2018 and 2019, as well being knocked out in the round of 16 in three successive Coppa Italia campaigns. In the home match against Lazio on 25 February 2018, club captain Francesco Magnanelli made his 400th appearance for Sassuolo since joining the club's in its most recent spell in Serie C2 in 2005, having led the Neroverdi through three promotions and also playing in European competition in that time. On 13 June 2018, Roberto De Zerbi was appointed as manager, after impressing with his possession-based tactics at relegated Benevento in the previous season.

The 2019–20 season oversaw an improvement in Sassuolo's fortunes. The club concluded the season in 8th position, just outside the final qualifying position for the UEFA Europa League, marking only the second top-half Serie A finish in its history. A primary reason for Sassuolo's growth was due to De Zerbi's innovative, attack-minded style of play, which began to flourish and led to a record-breaking Serie A goal return of 69, the most prolific the club has been since promotion in 2013. The transfer of Francesco Caputo from Empoli in the preceding off-season was particularly crucial to this, as the striker ended the campaign with 21 league goals, and wingers Jérémie Boga and Domenico Berardi also achieved double-figure goal tallies.

The club continued its development as a top 10 team in Serie A in the following season, in which the record of 61 points in 2015–16 was broken with another 8th place finish on 62 points. After eight matches, Sassuolo was placed second in the table, which in part was the result of the excellent form of the likes of Berardi, Manuel Locatelli, Filip Đuričić, amongst others. An impressive 2-0 away win against Napoli on matchday six was perhaps the best reflection of this impressive early-season form. Although the club's form declined slightly in the mid-stage of the season, a 2-0 victory over Lazio on the final matchday meant that Sassuolo reached the same points total as Roma in 7th place, but narrowly missed out on European qualification on goal difference. Berardi, in his eighth professional season with the club, enjoyed the best year of his career with 17 league goals and his double in a 3-1 against Fiorentina on 17 April 2021 meant that he had reached 100 goals in all competitions for the Neroverdi. De Zerbi announced he would leave the club at the end of the season to take up the vacant head coach position at Shakhtar Donetsk. On 11 July 2021, Sassuolo’s Manuel Locatelli, Domenico Berardi and Giacomo Raspadori were part of the Italy national squad that defeated England in the UEFA Euro 2020 final.

Stadium & Kit 

Sassuolo's home stadium is the Stadio Enzo Ricci in Sassuolo, still used by the club for training, but due to its tiny capacity (4,000) the club played Serie B seasons in Modena's Stadio Alberto Braglia.

Starting from the 2013–14 season, the first Serie A campaign for the club, Sassuolo plays in Reggio Emilia at the renovated Mapei Stadium – Città del Tricolore (formerly Stadio Giglio) in a venue-sharing agreement with Lega Pro Prima Divisione club Reggiana.<ref>{{Cite web |url=http://www.gazzetta.it/Calcio/Squadre/Sassuolo/notizie/24-06-2013/sassulo-trofeo-tim-juve-milan-20647501610.shtml |title="/>  The stadium was also bought by the parent company of Sassuolo, Mapei.

Sassuolo's famous green kit originates from a donation from English side Lancaster Rovers FC. During a tour of Italy in 1921, the Rover's side were unable to fulfil a fixture with Sassuolo and as a way of apology, donated their green shirts for Sassuolo to keep.

Players

Current squad

Other players under contract

Out on loan 
.

Youth sector

Coaching staff

Managers

Recent seasons

Honours 
 Serie B
 Winners: 2012–13
 Serie C1
 Winners: 2007–08
 Supercoppa di Serie C
 Winners: 2008
 Serie D
 Winners: 1983–84, 1997–98,
 Promozione Emilia-Romagna
 Winners: 1980–81

In Europe

References

External links 

Official website

 
Football clubs in Italy
Football clubs in Emilia-Romagna
Association football clubs established in 1920
Serie A clubs
Serie B clubs
Serie C clubs
1920 establishments in Italy
Companies based in the Province of Modena